All-Ireland (sometimes All-Island) refers to all of Ireland, as opposed to the separate jurisdictions of the Republic of Ireland and Northern Ireland. "All-Ireland" is most frequently used to refer to sporting teams or events for the entire island, but also has related meanings in politics and religion.

In sports

Many but far from all sports are organised on an all-Ireland basis.

"All-Ireland" is often used as an abbreviation of All-Ireland Championship, held by sports organised on All-Ireland basis.  In particular:
 All-Ireland Senior Football Championship in Gaelic football
 All-Ireland Senior Hurling Championship in hurling

Many sports are organised on an all-Ireland basis, for example American football, basketball, boxing, cricket, curling, Gaelic games, golf, hockey, lawn bowls, korfball, Quidditch, rugby league and rugby union, in which case the international team is usually referred to simply as "Ireland". Others are organised primarily on an all-Ireland basis, but with both "Ireland" and "Great Britain" international teams, in which case participants from Northern Ireland may opt for either — these include tennis, swimming, athletics, rowing and any events at the Olympics. Some others have separate Northern Ireland and Republic of Ireland organisations and teams, including notably football and snooker.

Similarly, the term may be used in reference to annual competitions in certain traditional music and art forms:

 All-Ireland Fleadh in Irish music (see Fleadh Cheoil)
 All-Ireland Feis in Irish dance
 List of All-Ireland Champions in Traditional Irish music
The All Ireland Talent Show

In religion
It is also used in the title Primate of All Ireland, the senior clergyman in each of the Roman Catholic Church and the Church of Ireland:

 the Roman Catholic Archbishop of Armagh, the Catholic Primate of All Ireland
 the Church of Ireland's Archbishop of Armagh, the Anglican Primate of All Ireland

Most Christian denominations are organised on an All-Ireland basis, with a single organisation for both the Republic of Ireland and Northern Ireland.

In politics
In Irish republicanism, expression "Counties of Ireland" is often used instead: 32 as distinct from the 26 traditional counties of the Republic and the remaining 6 of Northern Ireland. Those who subscribe to Irish republican legitimatism, the concept that the Irish Republic continues to exist, refer to the All-Ireland Republic to distinguish from the 26 county Republic of Ireland.

Republican Sinn Féin hold an Eve of All Ireland Rally ahead of the senior All-Ireland Football Championship final on O'Connell Street, Dublin.

The term is also sometimes used to refer to the cross-border agencies established by agreement between the Republic of Ireland and United Kingdom governments, and whose powers extend to both jurisdictions on the island: North/South Ministerial Council, Waterways Ireland, Food Safety Promotion Board, Special European Union Programmes Body, The North/South Language Body, InterTradeIreland, Tourism Ireland, and the Commissioners of Irish Lights and other non-profit organisations organised on an All-Ireland basis, such as Uplift (Ireland).

See also
List of flags of Ireland § Island of Ireland

References 

Sport in Ireland
Irish culture